2-Ethyl-4,5-dimethylphenol is a phenol found in the essential oil of rosemary (Rosmarinus officinalis). It is also found in female elephant urine samples.

References 

Alkylphenols